Joseph Kirkland (January 18, 1770 – January 26, 1844) was an American lawyer and politician from New York.

Early life
Joseph Kirkland was born on January 18, 1770, in Newent Society, in that part of the Town of Norwich which was later separated as the Town of Lisbon, in New London County, Connecticut, to Joseph Kirkland and Hannah Perkins. Kirkland graduated from Yale College in 1790. Then he studied law and was admitted to the bar in 1794.

Career
Kirkland commenced practice in New Hartford, New York. He was a member of the New York State Assembly (Oneida Co.) in 1804 and 1804–05.

He moved to Utica in 1813, and was District Attorney for the Sixth District (comprising Otsego, Herkimer and Oneida counties) from 1813 to 1816. He was again a member of the State Assembly in 1818 (Oneida Co.) and in 1820-21 (Oneida and Oswego Co.).

He was elected as a Federalist to the 17th United States Congress, holding office from December 3, 1821, to March 4, 1823. Afterwards he resumed the practice of law, and was again a member of the State Assembly (Oneida Co.) in 1825; When Utica was incorporated as a city in 1832, Kirkland became the new city's first mayor and served from 1832 to 1836.

Personal life 
Kirkland had 2 daughters with his girlfriend Sarah Backus:
 Sarah Backus Kirkland (1810 - July 15, 1872), who married John Gelston Floyd.
 Louisa Kirkland (January 18, 1813 – June 1885), who married Charles Tracy, an author and attorney.

Death 
Kirkland died on January 26, 1844, in Utica, New York; and was buried at the Forest Hill Cemetery there.

References 

 
 The New York Civil List compiled by Franklin Benjamin Hough (pages 71, 177f, 193, 197, 202, 286 and 368; Weed, Parsons and Co., 1858)

1770 births
1844 deaths
People from Lisbon, Connecticut
People of colonial Connecticut
Federalist Party members of the United States House of Representatives from New York (state)
Mayors of Utica, New York
County district attorneys in New York (state)
Yale College alumni
Burials at Forest Hill Cemetery (Utica, New York)